The Boeing P-8 Poseidon is an American maritime patrol and reconnaissance aircraft developed and produced by Boeing Defense, Space & Security, and derived from the civilian Boeing 737-800. It was developed for the United States Navy (USN).

The P-8 operates in the anti-submarine warfare (ASW), anti-surface warfare (ASUW), and intelligence, surveillance and reconnaissance (ISR) roles. It is armed with torpedoes, Harpoon anti-ship missiles, and other weapons, can drop and monitor sonobuoys, and can operate in conjunction with other assets, including the Northrop Grumman MQ-4C Triton maritime surveillance unmanned aerial vehicle (UAV).

The P-8 is operated by the United States Navy, the Indian Navy, the Royal Australian Air Force, and the United Kingdom's Royal Air Force. It has also been ordered by the Royal Norwegian Air Force, the Royal New Zealand Air Force, the Republic of Korea Navy, and the German Navy.

Development

Origins
The Lockheed P-3 Orion, a turboprop ASW aircraft, has been in service with the United States Navy (USN) since 1962. In the 1980s, the USN began studies for a P-3 replacement, the range and endurance of which were reduced due to increasing weight and airframe fatigue life limitations. The specification required a new aircraft to have reduced operating and support costs. In 1989, Lockheed was awarded a fixed-price contract to develop the P-7, but this was canceled the following year.

In 2000, a second competition for a replacement began. Lockheed Martin submitted the Orion 21, an updated new-build version of the P-3. Boeing's proposal was based on its 737-800 airliner. BAE Systems offered a new-build version of the Nimrod MRA4, a British jet-powered maritime patrol aircraft. BAE withdrew from the competition in October 2002, recognizing that without a production partner based in the United States, the bid was politically unrealistic. On 14 May 2004, Boeing was selected as the winner of the Multimission Maritime Aircraft program.

In June 2004, the USN awarded a development contract to Boeing. The project was planned to be for at least 108 airframes for the USN. More orders are possible from the other nations operating over 200 P-3s. Project value is expected to be worth at least $15 billion. Raytheon, Northrop Grumman, Spirit AeroSystems, GE Aviation Systems, Marshall Aerospace and Defence Group, CFM International, BAE Systems, and Marotta are major subcontractors. In July 2004, the USN placed an order for five aircraft, and the first flight-test aircraft was to be completed in 2009. On 30 March 2005, it was assigned the P-8A designation.

Design phase and testing

The P-8 is to replace the P-3. Initially, it was equipped with legacy systems with later upgrades to incorporate newer technology. The Government Accountability Office credited the incremental approach with keeping the project on schedule and on budget. The Naval Air Systems Command (NAVAIR) deleted the requirement for the P-8A to be equipped with magnetic anomaly detection (MAD) equipment as a weight reduction measure, improving endurance. A hydrocarbon sensor detects fuel vapors from diesel-powered submarines and ships.

The P-8's first flight was on 25 April 2009. The second and third P-8s had flown and were in flight testing in early August 2010. On 11 August 2010, low-rate production of the P-8 was approved. A P-8 released sonobuoys for the first time on 15 October 2010, dropping six in three separate low-altitude passes. In 2011, the ice detection system was found to be defective due to the use of counterfeit components; allegedly these parts were poorly refurbished and sold to subcontractor BAE Systems as new by a Chinese supplier.

On 4 March 2012, the first production P-8A was delivered to the USN, flying to Naval Air Station Jacksonville, Florida, for training with the Fleet Replacement Squadron (FRS), Patrol Squadron 30 (VP-30). On 24 September 2012, Boeing announced a $1.9 billion order for 11 aircraft. On 10 June 2013, a U.S. Department of Defense (DoD) Inspector General (IG) report recommended delaying full-rate production over a lack of key data to assess if the P-8 met operational requirements; additional tests were also needed to guarantee a 25-year lifespan. Boeing executives dismissed the report, saying that the test program was on track. In 2013, full-rate production was delayed until the P-8 could demonstrate it can survive its 25-year lifespan without structural fatigue, overcome deficiencies, track surface ships, and perform primary missions.

On 24 June 2013, during weapons integration testing, the P-8 achieved a significant milestone by firing a live AGM-84 Harpoon anti-ship missile and scored a direct hit on a low-cost modular target. On 1 July 2013, an initial operational test and evaluation (IOT&E) report found that the P-8A was "operationally effective, operationally suitable, and ready for fleet introduction."  Six test and nine low-rate initial production aircraft had been delivered at that point. On 31 July 2013, Boeing received a $2.04 billion contract to build 13 P-8As in the fourth low-rate initial production lot, for a fleet of 37 aircraft by the end of 2016, and long-lead parts for 16 P-8As of the first full-rate production lot.

In January 2014, Naval Air Systems Command proceeded with full-rate production of the P-8A. Increment 1 systems include persistent anti-submarine warfare (ASW) capabilities and an integrated sensor suite; in 2016, Increment 2 upgrades will add multi-static active coherent acoustics, an automated identification system, and high-altitude anti-submarine weapons. Increment 3 in 2020 shall enable "net-enabled anti-surface warfare".

In July 2014, Fred Smith, business development director for the P-8, noted that the program had: "saved $2.1 billion on 2004 estimates of the cost of production... the aircraft is now selling for $150 million, down from the forecasted $216 million". The halving of USN orders from 16 aircraft per year down to 8 in 2015 due to the expiration of the Bipartisan Budget Act of 2013 was expected to be partially offset by commercial 737 sales and P-8 export sales. The DoD wants to follow a program template for the P-8 similar to the Joint Strike Fighter (JSF) program, with international cooperation from prospective users.

Derivatives
In 2010, Boeing proposed to replace the United States Air Force's (USAF) E-8 Joint STARS fleet with a modified P-8 at the same cost Northrop Grumman proposed for re-engining and upgrading the E-8s. The proposed P-8 Airborne Ground Surveillance (AGS) would integrate an active electronically scanned array (AESA) radar, and have ground moving target indicator (GMTI) and synthetic aperture radar (SAR) capabilities. A key feature was a pod-mounted radar on the fuselage's lower centerline, positioned so the engine nacelles do not obstruct its line of sight. It reuses the P-8A's Raytheon AN/APY-10 multi-mission surface search radar. Two aft ventral fins increase stability.

In 2013, Boeing proposed repackaging some of the P-8's systems in the smaller and less expensive Bombardier Challenger 600 series business jet, as the Boeing Maritime Surveillance Aircraft (MSA). In 2014, Boeing also offered a JSTARS replacement based on the 737-700, rather than the P-8's 737-800.

Design

The P-8 is a militarized version of the 737-800ERX, a 737-800 with 737-900-based wings. The fuselage is similar to, but longer than, the 737-700-based C-40 Clipper transport aircraft in service with the USN. The P-8 has a strengthened fuselage for low-altitude operations and raked wingtips similar to those fitted to the Boeing 767-400ER, instead of the blended winglets available on 737NG variants.

In order to power additional onboard electronics, the P-8 has a 180 kVA electric generator on each engine, replacing the 90 kVA generator of civilian 737s; this required the redesigning of the nacelles and their wing mountings. The P-8 has a smoother flight experience, subjecting crews to less turbulence and fumes than the preceding P-3, allowing them to concentrate better on missions.

The P-8 features the Raytheon APY-10 multi-mission surface search radar; the P-8I features an international version of the APY-10. Unlike the preceding P-3, the P-8 lacks a magnetic anomaly detector (MAD) due to its higher operational altitude; its acoustic sensor system is reportedly more effective at acoustic tracking and thus lacking a MAD will not impede its detection capabilities; India's P-8I is equipped with a MAD per the contract request.

Various sensor data are combined via data fusion software to track targets. Following the cancellation of Lockheed Martin's Aerial Common Sensor project, Boeing proposed a signals intelligence variant of the P-8 for the USN's requirement. During the P-8A Increment 2 upgrade in 2016, the APS-149 Littoral Surveillance Radar System (LSRS) will be replaced by the Advanced Airborne Sensor radar.

The five operator stations (two naval flight officers plus three enlisted Aviation Warfare Operators/naval aircrewman) are mounted in a sideways row, along the port side of the cabin. Other than one large window on each side of the forward cabin for two observers, none of the other crew stations have windows. A short bomb bay for torpedoes and other stores opens behind the wing.

In U.S. service, the P-8A is complemented by the MQ-4C Triton unmanned aerial vehicle (UAV) which provides continuous surveillance. In January 2015, BAE Systems was awarded a contract for the USN's High Altitude ASW (HAASW) Unmanned Targeting Air System (UTAS) program to develop a sub-hunting UAV equipped with a MAD for launching from the P-8.

The P-8 cannot use the hose-and-drogue in-flight refueling method, instead featuring a flying boom receptacle on the upper-forward fuselage, making it, like the USN's E-6 Mercury TACAMO aircraft, reliant on USAF KC-135 Stratotanker, KC-10 Extender and KC-46 Pegasus aircraft for in-flight refueling. In April 2017, the USAF 459th Air Refueling Wing worked with the Naval Air Systems Command to certify operationally the P-8 for in-flight refueling. For extended endurance, six additional fuel tanks from Marshall Aerospace are housed in the forward and rear cargo compartments.

Operational history

United States

In February 2012, the P-8 made its mission debut during "Bold Alligator" 2012, an annual littoral warfare exercise. In April 2012, it took part in Exercise Joint Warrior, flying out of RAF Lossiemouth. During RIMPAC 2012 in the Hawaiian area, two P-8As participated in 24 scenarios as part of Air Test and Evaluation Squadron One (VX-1) while forward deployed to Marine Corps Base Hawaii.

On 29 November 2013, its inaugural deployment began when six aircraft and 12 air crews of squadron VP-16 departed its home station of NAS Jacksonville, Florida, for Kadena Air Base in Okinawa, Japan. This deployment was a pre-planned regional re-balancing action, but occurred shortly after China's establishment of the East China Sea Air Defense Identification Zone, heightening tensions.

During exercises in 2012 and 2013, and an overseas deployment to Japan, the P-8 reportedly exhibited radar, sensor integration, and data transfer problems, leading to additional testing. In 2012–3, Director, Operational Test and Evaluation of the US government evaluated the P-8A Increment 1, and reported the following findings:
P-8A was effective for small-area and cued ASW search, localization and attack missions, but lacked the broad-area ASW acoustic search capability of the P-3C. P-8A's Mk 54 torpedoes were of limited use against evasive targets.
P-8A was effective at ASuW search, detection and classification in all-weather at short to medium ranges for all surface vessels and at longer ranges for larger vessels.
P-8A was not effective for Intelligence, Surveillance and Reconnaissance mission due to various issues including lack of high-resolution SAR capability.
P-8A had much better range, speed, and reliability than older aircraft.

DOTE concluded that it was not ready for deployment. Pentagon acquisition undersecretary Frank Kendall disputed the report, saying that although its findings are factual, it did not acknowledge future capability upgrades for anti-submarine and wider-area surveillance.

A second squadron, VP-5, completed its transition to the P-8 in August 2013. During mid-2014, a pair of P-8s were dispatched to Perth, Australia for two months for an international search for the missing Malaysia Airlines Flight 370. On 2 October 2015, USN P-8s stationed at Naval Air Station Jacksonville, Florida, alongside U.S. Coast Guard HC-144A Ocean Sentry, HC-130H and USAF Reserve HC-130P Combat Shadow aircraft, searched the Eastern Caribbean Sea for the missing SS El Faro cargo ship that sank on 1 October in the Category 3 Hurricane Joaquin near Crooked Island in the Bahamas. On 20 February 2018, a P-8 of Patrol Squadron Eight (VP-8) rescued three fishermen whose vessel had been adrift in the South Pacific Ocean for eight days, deploying a search and rescue (SAR) kit containing supplies and communications equipment, the first time that a P-8 deployed a SAR kit in a real operation.

USN P-8s routinely rotate through bases of allies.  In September 2014, the Malaysian government offered the use of bases in East Malaysia for P-8s, but no flights have yet been approved.

On 7 December 2015, P-8s were deployed to Singapore as part of a Defense Cooperation Agreement between the US and Singapore for "fighting terrorism and piracy." China criticized the Singapore deployment as "regional militarization by the U.S." The third detachment of two P-8s based in Paya Lebar Air Base, Singapore, participated in naval military drills with the Singapore Armed Forces (SAF) in mid 2016.

During the 2022 Russian invasion of Ukraine, at or before the time when the Russian Navy cruiser Moskva suffered damage and caught fire on 13–14 April, a U.S. Navy P-8A from Italy was patrolling within its radar range over the Black Sea and the U.S., when asked, did identify the ship as the Moskva as part of intelligence sharing to help Ukraine "defend against attack from Russian ships." The Moskva later sank. Ukraine claimed to have hit the vessel with one or more Neptune missiles. Russia claimed that the damage was accidental and not caused by a missile strike.

India

In January 2008, Boeing proposed the P-8I, a customized export variant of the P-8A, for the Indian Navy. It features two major components not fitted on the P-8A, a Telephonics APS-143 OceanEye aft radar and a magnetic anomaly detector (MAD). On 4 January 2009, India's Ministry of Defence signed a US$2.1 billion agreement with Boeing for eight P-8Is to replace the Indian Navy's aging Tupolev Tu-142M maritime surveillance turboprops. It was Boeing's first military sale to India and the P-8's first international customer.

In October 2010, India's Defence Acquisition Council approved the purchase of four additional P-8Is; contract signature followed in July 2016 with deliveries expected to start from 2020. In 2011, India planned to order twelve more P-8Is at a later date; in 2019, this was cut to eight to ten due to a limited budget. In November 2019, the Indian government approved the procurement of six more P-8Is. In April 2021, the US Department of State approved a possible Foreign Military Sale of six more P-8Is to India pending Congressional approval. Of the 4 additional P-8Is ordered the first was delivered to Indian naval air station INS Hansa, Dabolim Goa on 19 November 2020, followed by another on 13 July 2021, the remaining 2 were delivered on 30 December 2021.

The Bharat Electronics Limited (BEL) Data Link II communications allows the P-8I to exchange tactical data between Indian Navy aircraft, ships and shore establishments; it also features an integrated BEL-developed IFF system. India has purchased AGM-84L Harpoon Block II missiles and Mk 54 All-Up-Round Lightweight torpedoes for the P-8I. In July 2012, Boeing began P-8I flight testing.

On 19 December 2012, the first P-8I was handed over at Boeing's facility in Seattle. It was inducted into the Indian Navy on 15 May 2013. The type is based at INS Rajali, in Tamil Nadu. In 2014, several Indian Navy P-8Is conducted search operations for the missing Malaysia Airlines Flight 370. The Indian Navy inducted the first squadron in November 2015. P-8Is participated in the 2017 Doklam Standoff between Indian Army and China's People's Liberation Army. Indian Navy P-8Is also monitored Pakistani Army units during the 2019 Pulwama standoff.

Australia

On 20 July 2007, the Australian Minister for Defence announced that the P-8A was the preferred aircraft to replace the Royal Australian Air Force fleet of Lockheed AP-3C Orions in conjunction with a then yet-to-be-selected unmanned aerial vehicle. The last AP-3C was scheduled to be retired in 2018, after nearly 30 years of service. In March 2009, Australia's Chief of Air Force stated that, subject to government approval, the RAAF would introduce the P-8 in 2016.

In October 2012, Australia formalized its participation, committing A$73.9m (US$81.1m) in an agreement with the USN. In July 2013, Air Marshal Geoff Brown, head of the RAAF, said Australia was considering buying more P-8s and fewer MQ-4C Triton UAVs than earlier planned. On 21 February 2014, Prime Minister Tony Abbott announced the intention to procure eight P-8s plus options for four more; entry into service is planned for 2021.

In July 2014, negotiations commenced between Boeing and the US Department of Defense to integrate the AGM-84 Harpoon Block 1G anti-ship missile onto the P-8A on Australia's behalf. In August 2014, the USN concluded an advanced acquisition contract on the first four of up to 12 P-8As to be bought by Australia, with delivery expected from 2017. In January 2016, Australia ordered a further four P-8s. The 2016 Defence White Paper stated that eight P-8s would be in service in the early 2020s and that 15 P-8s are planned for by the late 2020s. Including support facilities, the first group of eight aircraft's total cost is estimated at $3.6 billion (AU$4 billion).

The RAAF accepted its first P-8 on 27 September 2016; it arrived in Australia on 14 November. The RAAF has received 12 P-8As by 13 December 2019. The Australian Government approved ordering of two additional aircraft on 30 December 2020. The option to acquire a 15th aircraft may not be taken up.

According to the Australian Defence Minister, Richard Marles, in May 2022, a Chinese J-16 is alleged to have flown alongside a RAAF P-8, deploying flares and chaff. One piece of chaff is alleged to have gone into the P-8's engine.

United Kingdom

In August 2012, it was reported that Boeing saw the United Kingdom as a market for the P-8, following the cancellation of the Nimrod MRA4. On 23 November 2015, the UK announced its intention to order nine P-8s in the Strategic Defence and Security Review 2015. They are to be based at RAF Lossiemouth, Scotland and shall protect the UK's nuclear deterrent and aircraft carriers, as well as perform search-and-rescue and overland reconnaissance missions.

On 25 March 2016, the U.S. State Department approved a proposed Foreign Military Sale to the UK for up to nine P-8s and associated support. The Royal Air Force (RAF) plans to operate the P-8 with U.S. weapons initially, and may transition to British weapons later. It is unclear whether the UK will have access to future ground-surveillance capabilities developed for the P-8. On 11 July 2016, Boeing announced the signing of a $3.87 billion (£3 billion) contract for nine P-8s and support infrastructure, spread across three production lots over a ten-year period, with deliveries commencing in 2019.

The RAF has the service name Poseidon MRA1. They are operated by No. 120 Squadron and No. 201 Squadron. The first Poseidon MRA1 (ZP801) made its initial flight on 13 July 2019. The UK took delivery of the first aircraft, named Pride of Moray, at Boeing's Seattle facility on 29 October. It arrived at Kinloss Barracks in February 2020 before relocating to RAF Lossiemouth in October 2020, along with ZP802 which was delivered on 13 March 2020. The RAF declared the P-8 had reached initial operating capability (IOC) on 1 April 2020. The final aircraft arrived in January 2022.

Poseidon names:
ZP801 – Pride of Moray
ZP802 – City of Elgin
ZP803 – Terence Bulloch DSO* DFC*
ZP804 – Spirit of Reykjavík
ZP805 – Fulmar
ZP806 – Guernsey's Reply
ZP807 – William Barker VC

Norway
In March 2014, Norwegian newspaper Dagbladet reported that the Royal Norwegian Air Force is considering leasing aircraft from Boeing as No. 333 Squadron RNoAF's six P-3 Orions were becoming increasingly difficult to keep operational. In June 2016, Norwegian newspaper Verdens Gang reported that the Norwegian government would buy four new surveillance aircraft in its long-term defense plan; the P-8 was seen as the main option. In December 2016, the U.S. State Department approved the sale with congressional approval pending.

On 29 March 2017, Norway signed a contract for five P-8As, to be delivered between 2022 and 2023. On 13 July 2021, Boeing rolled out first P-8As Poseidon aircraft from the paint shop for Norway. The first aircraft was delivered on 18 November 2021. It is to be operated by the 133 Air Wing, 333 Squadron at Evenes Air Station.

New Zealand
Boeing publicly identified the Royal New Zealand Air Force as a potential customer in 2008, as a replacement for its P-3 Orions, due for replacement in 2025. In April 2017, the U.S. State Department approved the possible foreign military sale of up to four P-8As with equipment and support, valued at US$1.46 billion. In July 2018, the New Zealand government announced the purchase of four P-8As, to begin operations in 2023.

Four P-8As were ordered in March 2019. The RNZAF is planning to operate the type for at least 30 years. In September 2020, the inaugural Royal New Zealand Air Force crew for the P-8A graduated training at Jacksonville, Florida. This crew will then qualify as instructors to train the first RNZAF crews back in New Zealand. The first P-8A was delivered in December 2022.

South Korea
In May 2013, it was announced that the Defense Acquisition Program Administration (DAPA) was commencing a  procurement program to acquire up to 20 ASW aircraft to replace the Republic of Korea Navy's fleet of 16 P-3Cs; possible candidates included the C-295 MPA, P-8, Saab Swordfish and the SC-130J Sea Hercules. DAPA considered procuring 12 to 20 ex-USN Lockheed S-3 Vikings. In 2017, the ROKN canceled plans to buy refurbished S-3s.

On 26 June 2018, it was announced that DAPA had selected the P-8 and would acquire six aircraft through the US Foreign Military Sales program. On 13 September 2018, the US state department stated it supported the sale of 6 P-8s and notified Congress. South Korea ordered six P-8As in March 2019 and expected to be completed by June 2020.

Germany
The US Department of State approved a possible Foreign Military Sale of five P-8As with associated equipment to Germany for an estimated cost of $1.77 billion. The US Defense Security Cooperation Agency (DSCA) notified US Congress of the possible sale on 12 March 2021. On 23 June 2021, Germany approved the purchase of five P-8As worth $1.31 billion. On 28 September 2021, Germany finalized the purchase and is to retire its existing P-3C Orions when the P-8s are delivered.

Member of the Bundestag Enak Ferlemann confirmed to German newspaper Nordsee-Zeitung that part of the €100 billion ($112.7 billion) special fund (a consequence of the 2022 Russian invasion of Ukraine) for the German armed forces would be spent towards acquiring an additional seven P-8As.

Potential operators

Brazil
On 23 September 2022, Boeing's Latin America director, Tim Flood, presented the capabilities of the P-8 to the Brazilian Air Force commander, General Carlos de Almeida Baptista Júnior. According to Baptista Júnior, "the discussions have a great importance to prospect the future of FAB's maritime patrol aviation", as part of a plan to replace its P-3AMs currently in service.

Canada
Boeing identified that the Royal Canadian Air Force's fleet of CP-140 Auroras (Canadian variant of the P-3 Orion) would begin to reach the end of their service life by 2025. Boeing offered the Challenger MSA, a smaller and cheaper aircraft based on the Bombardier Challenger 650 integrating many of the P-8's sensors and equipment, to complement but not replace the CP-140s. Boeing's Aurora replacement offer was the P-8A with modifications specific to Canadian operations.

In 2019, Canada announced the start of a project to replace its CP-140 Aurora aircraft, named "Canadian Multimission Aircraft Project". Under the requirements, the Canadian Armed Forces need a manned, long-range platform, capable of providing C4, ISR, and ASW with the ability to engage/control and to fully integrate with other ISR and ASW assets. The project is valued at greater than Can$5 billion. In 2022, Boeing officially announced they would offer the P-8A in the Canadian Multi-Mission Aircraft project with CAE, GE Aviation Canada, IMP Aerospace & Defence, KF Aerospace, Honeywell Aerospace Canada and Raytheon Canada.

Italy
Italy indicated interest in purchasing P-8s, with fleet support provided by Alitalia, in 2004. However, in December 2008, Italy announced the purchase of four ATR 72 aircraft to replace its aging Atlantic maritime patrol fleet, possibly as a temporary solution because Italy remained interested in the P-8.

Malaysia
In December 2017, the Royal Malaysian Air Force's Brigadier General Yazid Bin Arshad announced it had shortlisted four aircraft types to replace the force's aging fleet of Beechcraft Super King Air maritime patrol aircraft; these are the EADS CASA C-295 from Airbus, the P-8 from Boeing, ATR 72 MP from ATR, and the CASA/IPTN CN-235, possibly provided by either Airbus or Indonesian Aerospace, which acquired a licence to produce it. Arshad added that: "these four types are shortlisted, the door is not closed yet", indicating other options may be possible.

NATO
In April 2019, Boeing was reported to be in exploratory talks with various NATO allies to offer the P-8 as a NATO-shared interim solution to provide European allies with its capabilities until domestic capabilities could be secured by 2035.

Saudi Arabia
In 2017, Boeing announced it had signed several agreements with Saudi Arabia, which intends to order P-8 aircraft. The International Institute for Strategic Studies reported in 2019 that a Saudi order for the type was still pending.

Turkey
In 2016, Turkey indicated that it planned to acquire a new MMA aircraft to supplement existing assets, the P-8A being the main candidate based on the required performance.

Variants
 P-8A Poseidon – Production variant developed for the United States Navy.
 P-8I Neptune – Export variant for the Indian Navy with a CAE Inc AN/ASQ-508A Magnetic Anomaly Detector (MAD) and a Griffon Corporation Telephonics APS-143C(V)3 multi mode aft radar added.
 Poseidon MRA1 – Royal Air Force designation for the P-8A.
 P-8 AGS – An Airborne Ground Surveillance variant proposed to the USAF in 2010 as replacement to the E-8 Joint STARS fleet; equipped with a pod-mounted, active electronically scanned array (AESA) radar.

Operators

 Royal Australian Air Force – 12 P-8As delivered as of July 2022, with an additional 2 on order.
RAAF Base Edinburgh, South Australia
No. 11 Squadron
No. 292 Squadron (Operational Conversion Unit)

 German Navy – 5 P-8As on order, with deliveries beginning in 2024. 7 more planned.

 Indian Navy – 12 P-8Is delivered as of February 2022.
INS Rajali, Tamil Nadu
INAS 312-A
INS Hansa, Goa.
INAS 316

 Royal New Zealand Air Force – The first P-8A was delivered in December 2022, with a further 3 aircraft to be delivered by mid-2023.
RNZAF Base Ohakea
No. 5 Squadron

 Royal Norwegian Air Force – 5 P-8A delivered as of 26 May 2022 with 2 delivered to Naval Air Station Jacksonville for training and 3 in Norway. 5 P-8As were on order.

 Republic of Korea Navy – 6 P-8As on order, with deliveries beginning in 2022.

 Royal Air Force – 9 Poseidon MRA1s delivered as of January 2022.
RAF Lossiemouth, Moray, Scotland
No. 54 Squadron (OCU)
No. 120 Squadron
No. 201 Squadron

 United States Navy – 112 P-8As delivered through July 2022, with 128 aircraft on order in April 2021.
Dallas Love Field, Texas
BUPERS SDC Dallas
Naval Air Station Jacksonville, Florida
VPU-2
VP-5
VP-8
VP-10
VP-16
VP-26
VP-30 (Fleet Replacement Squadron)
VP-45

Naval Air Station Patuxent River, Maryland
VX-1
VX-20
Naval Air Station Whidbey Island, Washington
VP-1
VP-4
VP-9
VP-40
VP-46
VP-47

Specifications (P-8A)

See also

References

Notes

Bibliography

External links

 
 P-8 NAVAIR page and P-8 fact file on Navy.mil 
 P-8A Poseidon – Australian International Airshow 2009
 Boeing P-8A Poseidon Maritime Patrol Aircraft (MPA) Multi-mission Maritime Aircraft (MMA) on navyrecognition.com
 

P-08 Poseidon
2000s United States patrol aircraft
Twinjets
Low-wing aircraft
Aircraft first flown in 2009
Boeing military aircraft